Women at War is an eight-episode Franco-Belgian historical miniseries created by Cécile Lorne and directed by Alexandre Laurent, which originally aired on TF1 in September 2022.
 
It has been available on Netflix since October 2022 for French viewers and January 2023 internationally. The series has appeared among the Netflix top 10 shows in 58 countries the following week.

Synopsis 
In 1914, during WW1, the destinies of four women intersect: Marguerite de Lancastel, a mysterious Parisian sex worker; Caroline Dewitt, propelled to the head of the family factory; Mother Agnès, Mother Superior of a requisitioned convent; and Suzanne Faure, a feminist nurse.

Cast 
 Brothel
 Audrey Fleurot: Marguerite de Lancastel. who is looking for her son
 Yannick Choirat: Marcel Dumont, the brothel owner
 Florence Loiret Caille: Yvonne Dumont, Marcel's sister
 Eden Ducourant : Juliette
 Emmanuelle Bouaziz: Florence
 Juliette Poissonnier: Alice
 Lilea Le Borgne: Solange
 Laure Franquès: Catherine
 Candice Pauilhac: Odile

 Convent
 Julie de Bona: Mother Agnès
 Camille Lou: Suzanne Faure, nurse, a former abortionist, accused of murder
 Tom Leeb: Joseph Duvernet, military doctor
 Laurent Gerra: Abbé Vautrin
 Marie Mallia: Sister Geneviève
 Maeva Dambron: Sister Clarence
 Bélinda Portoles: Sister Bélinda

 Truck Factory
 Sofia Essaïdi: Caroline Dewitt, Victor's wife.
 Sandrine Bonnaire: Éléonore Dewitt, mother of Charles and Victor.
 Grégoire Colin: Charles Dewitt
 Lionel Erdogan: Victor Dewitt, the factory owner
 Stacy Grewis Belotti: Madeleine Dewitt, Victor and Caroline's daughter
 Michaël Vander-Meiren: Jean
 Aurélie Boquien: Denise
 Catherine Artigala: Germaine

 French army
 Tchéky Karyo: General Duvernet
 Maxence Danet-Fauvel: Colin de Renier
 Édouard Eftimakis: Lieutenant Léon Duvernet
 Mikaël Mittelstadt: Gus
 Thomas Salsmann: Brief 
 Jérémy Wulc: Lieutenant Passembec
 Hervé Sogne: Colonel Keller
 Samuel Giuranna: Colonel Lehmann
 Nicolas Van Beveren: Captain Maurice Delille

 Others
 Romane Portail: Jeanne Charrier
 Vincent Rottiers: Lucien Charrier
 Cassiopée Mayance: Claudine
 Pascal Houdus: Till von Hoffstaten
 Jean-Michel Noirey: President Raymond Poincaré
 Noam Morgensztern (of Comédie-Française) : Louis Compoing, Parisian detective hunting Suzanne Faure

Reception 
The series has received an average score of 80% on Rotten Tomatoes.

Joel Keller writes in his review on Decider:  "STREAM IT. Women At War starts off a bit dry, but by the end of its first episode, viewers can see that the drama will start to be amped up, beyond the violence inherent in war."

Kayleigh Dray writes for Stylist: "Reactions to the series have been largely positive, with many praising its complex female characters, excellent twists and turns, and unflinching ability to portray 'the true horrors of World War I, both on the field and off of it.' Others, meanwhile, have thanks producers for adopting a non-exploitative approach when weaving the stories of the four women at its centre. And plenty have piled praise on cinematographers for all of those incredible panoramas of the war-ravaged French countryside, too."

References 

TF1 television dramas
2022 French television series debuts
2022 French television series endings
Television series set in the 20th century
World War I television drama series